Georg Eichhorn (born 1887, date of death unknown) was a Swiss sculptor. His work was part of the sculpture event in the art competition at the 1924 Summer Olympics.

References

1887 births
Year of death missing
19th-century Swiss sculptors
20th-century Swiss sculptors
Swiss sculptors
Olympic competitors in art competitions
Place of birth missing
20th-century Swiss male artists